The 2017 Mitre 10 Cup season was the twelfth season of New Zealand's provincial rugby union competition since it turned professional in 2006. The regular season began on August 17, when North Harbour hosted Otago. It involved the top fourteen rugby unions of New Zealand. For sponsorship reasons, the competition was known as the Mitre 10 Cup and it was the second season under the lead sponsor. The winner of the Championship, Wellington was promoted to the Premiership, the seventh placed Premiership team, Waikato was relegated to the Championship.

Format

The Mitre 10 Cup standings were sorted by a competition points system. Four points were awarded to the winning team, a draw equaled two points, whilst a loss amounted to zero points. Unions could also win their side a respectable bonus point. To receive a bonus point, they must have scored four tries or more or lose by seven or fewer points or less. Each team was placed on their total points received. If necessary of a tiebreaker, when two or more teams finish on equal points, the union who defeated the other in a head-to-head got placed higher. In case of a draw between them, the side with the biggest points deferential margin got rights to be ranked above. If they were tied on points difference, it was then decided by a highest scored try count or a coin toss. This seeding format was implemented since the beginning of the 2006 competition.

The competition included a promotion-relegation process with the winner of the Championship receiving automatic promotion to the Premiership, replacing the seventh-placed team in the Premiership which was relegated to the Championship for the following year. The regular season consisted of two types of matches. The internal division matches were when each team played the other six unions in their division once, home or away. The cross-division matches were when each team played four teams from the other division, thus missing out on three teams, each from the opposite division. Each union played home or away games against teams from the other division, making a total of ten competition games for each union. The finals format allowed the top four teams from each division move on to the semi-finals. The top two division winners, based on table points, received a home semi-final. In the first round of the finals, the semi-finals, the second division winner hosted the third division winner, and the first division winner hosted the fourth division winner. The final was hosted by the top remaining seed.

Standings
Source: Mitre 10 Cup standings 2017

Standings progression

Regular season
The 2017 Mitre 10 Cup played across nine weeks with every team playing one Wednesday night fixture in a double-up round where they played twice that week. The competition started on Thursday, August 17, with North Harbour taking on Otago at QBE Stadium, in a repeat of the previous seasons Championship Division final. The opening round saw a repeat of the Premiership final with Tasman against the then current champions Canterbury.

Week 1

Week 2

Week 3

Week 4

Week 5

Week 6

Week 7

Week 8

Week 9

Play-offs

Semi-finals

Finals

{| border="0" width="100%" 
|-
|

Statistics

Leading point scorers

Source: The weekly reviews of the matches published on provincial.rugby (see "Report" in the individual match scoring stats).

Leading try scorers

Source: The weekly reviews of the matches published on provincial.rugby (see "Report" in the individual match scoring stats).

Points by week

Source: Mitre 10 Cup Fixtures and Results 2017

Tries by week

Source: The weekly reviews of the matches published on provincial.rugby (see "Report" in the individual match scoring stats).

Sanctions

Ranfurly Shield

Pre-season challenges
December 2016, Canterbury accepted Ranfurly Shield challenges from both Wanganui and Mid Canterbury after it was confirmed that several offers were received from Mitre 10 Cup and Heartland Championship unions. Wanganui will travel to Christchurch and play at AMI Stadium, while the Shield will go on the road for a challenge against Mid-Canterbury which will be played at the Ashburton Showgrounds.

In the first challenge, Canterbury beat Wanganui 71−5 in Christchurch, after running in 10 tries with 10 uncapped players. Canterbury's win ensured them their 133rd successful Shield defence. Captain and halfback Jack Stratton scored the opening try in the 10th minute, before four more first-half tries resulted in the lead out to 36−5 at the break. Also early in the half, a yellow card was awarded to Wanganui prop Viki Tofa, for a high tackle on flanker Billy Harmon. Debutant first-five eighth Brett Cameron kicked 17 points in the match, while hooker Nick Werahiko scored a double. Wing Ngane Punivai impressed with his power and speed. Midfielder Timoci Seruwalu scored the visitors' only try late in the first half, when he powered over the line on the back of a close scrum. Wanganui veteran Peter Rowe retired after the loss with 112 games.

The late pre-season match saw the current holders take on Mid Canterbury, with the opposition losing all 13 of their Ranfurly Shield challenges, with eight of the defeats against Canterbury. Canterbury went on to win another successful defence 69–7. Having led 33–0 at halftime, the defending Mitre 10 Cup champions went on to run in eleven tries to one and beat the Heartland Championship side at the Ashburton Showgrounds. Former New Zealand under-20s World Cup winner Josh McKay was one of four Canterbury players to make their debut in the match, with himself and outside back Nigel Gibb, who beat four defenders on his way to the line, scoring  tries in the blowout win. Wing Marshall Suckling and hooker Nathan Vella scored doubles in the win also.

References

External links

National Provincial Championship
2017 in New Zealand rugby union
2017 rugby union tournaments for clubs